Ali Idow Hassan (born 1 July 1998) is a Somali middle distance runner.

Career
He was selected to compete at the 2020 Summer Games in the men's 1500 metres. He was granted an audience with then Somali president Mohamed Abdullahi Mohamed at the Presidential Palace in Mogadishu along with the Minister of Youth and Sports of the Federal Government of Somalia, Hamse Said Hamse, prior to the event.

He was given the honour of being a flag bearer for his nation in the Olympics opening ceremony. He ran a personal best in the 1500m in Tokyo, as he finished tenth in his heat in a time of 3.43:96.

He competed in the 800m at the 2022 African Championships and ran a personal best time of 1:49.03 as he qualified from his heat into the semi-finals where he was tenth fastest in a time of 1:49.24.

References

1998 births
Living people
Athletes (track and field) at the 2020 Summer Olympics
Olympic athletes of Somalia